Leave No Bridge Unburned is the third studio album by Canadian rock band Whitehorse.  Funded by Kickstarter, the album was released via Six Shooter Records on February 17, 2015.

The album was a long-listed nominee for the 2015 Polaris Music Prize, and won the Juno Award for Adult Alternative Album of the Year at the Juno Awards of 2016.

Reception

Leave No Bridge Unburned received positive reviews from critics. On Metacritic, the album holds a score of 84/100 based on 4 reviews, indicating "universal acclaim".

Track listing 
 Baby What's Wrong?
 Tame as the Wild Ones
 Downtown
 Sweet Disaster
 You Get Older
 Evangelina
 The One I Hurt
 Dear Irony
 Fake Your Death (And I'll Fake Mine)
 Oh Dolores
 The Walls Have Drunken Ears

References 

Whitehorse (band) albums
2015 albums
Six Shooter Records albums
Albums produced by Gus van Go
Juno Award for Adult Alternative Album of the Year albums